The South African national cricket team toured Australia in August 2000, well outside the normal Australian cricket season.  They played 3 One Day Internationals. The series was tied 1-1 with all matches played at the covered Docklands Stadium, Melbourne. The series was the first time ODI's were played under a closed roof.

ODI series summary

1st ODI

2nd ODI

3rd ODI

Statistics

Most runs
After the ODI's were played, Australian batsman, Steve Waugh ended up scoring the most runs in the series with 161 runs from three innings which included a century. He finished ahead of fellow Australian batsman, Michael Bevan and Adam Gilchrist with South African players Lance Klusener and Jonty Rhodes rounding out the top five.

Most wickets
Ian Harvey ended the series as the leading wicket taker with five wickets from three matches at an average of 16.80 runs per wicket. He was followed by Glenn McGrath, Nicky Boje and Roger Telemachus with four wickets while another five bowlers took three.

References

External links
 Cricinfo

2000 in Australian cricket
2000 
2000 in South African cricket